Silver stearate is a metal-organic compound with the chemical formula . The compound is classified as a metallic soap, i.e. a metal derivative of a fatty acid (stearic acid).

Synthesis
Silver stearate can be obtained by the reaction of sodium stearate and silver nitrate.

Also by the reaction of stearic acid and silver nitrate in presence of DBU.

Physical properties
Silver stearate forms white powder.

Silver stearate crystals are of triclinic crystal system; cell parameters a = 0.5431 nm, b = 4.871 nm, c = 0.4120 nm, α = 90.53°, β = 122.80°, γ = 90.12°, Z = 2.

The compound is insoluble in water, ethanol, diethyl ether.

References

Stearates
Silver compounds